The 1938–39 Indiana Hoosiers men's basketball team represented Indiana University. Their head coach was Branch McCracken, who was in his 1st year. The team played its home games in The Fieldhouse in Bloomington, Indiana, and was a member of the Big Ten Conference.

The Hoosiers finished the regular season with an overall record of 17–3 and a conference record of 9–3, finishing 2nd in the Big Ten Conference. Indiana was not invited to participate in any postseason tournament.

Roster

Schedule/Results

|-
!colspan=8| Regular Season
|-

References

Indiana
Indiana Hoosiers men's basketball seasons
1938 in sports in Indiana
1939 in sports in Indiana